Edward Burden (c.1540–1588) was a sixteenth century recusant priest.

Biography
Born in County Durham, he was a graduate of Corpus Christi College, Oxford. He studied at Duoay College and was ordained a priest in Rheims in 1584. He is probably best known for being one of the Eighty-five martyrs of England and Wales, for, arriving in England in 1586, he was captured two years later and executed by hanging, drawing and quartering in York on 29 November 1588,

He was beatified by Pope John Paul II on 22 November 1987.

See also
 Catholic Church in the United Kingdom
 Douai Martyrs

References

1540 births
1588 deaths
English beatified people
16th-century venerated Christians
People from County Durham
Eighty-five martyrs of England and Wales
16th-century English Roman Catholic priests
Alumni of Corpus Christi College, Oxford